The  was held on 3 February 2008 in Kannai Hall, Yokohama, Kanagawa, Japan.

Awards
 Best Film: I Just Didn't Do It
 Best Actor: Ryō Kase – I Just Didn't Do It
 Best Actress: Eriko Sato – Funuke Show Some Love, You Losers!
 Best Supporting Actor: Masatoshi Nagase – Funuke Show Some Love, You Losers!
 Best Supporting Actress: Hiromi Nagasaku – Funuke Show Some Love, You Losers!
 Best Director: Masayuki Suo – I Just Didn't Do It
 Best New Director: Daihachi Yoshida – Funuke Show Some Love, You Losers!
 Best Screenplay: Satoko Okudera – Talk Talk Talk, Kaidan
 Best Cinematography: Masakazu Ato – Funuke Show Some Love, You Losers!
 Best New Talent
Kii Kitano – Kōfuku na Shokutaku
Yui Aragaki – Koi Suru Madori, Waruboro, Koizora
Kaho – A Gentle Breeze in the Village
 Special Prize: Shiho Fujimura (Career)

Best 10
 I Just Didn't Do It
 A Gentle Breeze in the Village
 Talk Talk Talk
 Funuke Show Some Love, You Losers!
 Summer Days with Coo
 Tama Moe
 Dog in a Sidecar
 Hito ga Hito o Aisurukoto no Doushiyoumonasa
 Happily Ever After
 Yunagi City, Sakura Country
runner-up. Sukiyaki Western Django
 Welcome to the Quiet Room

References

Yokohama Film Festival
Y
Y
2008 in Japanese cinema
February 2008 events in Japan